Harry Freedman (Henryk Frydmann),  (April 5, 1922 – September 16, 2005) was a Canadian composer, English hornist, and music educator of Polish birth. He wrote a significant amount of symphonic works, including the scores to films such as The Bloody Brood (1959), Isabel (1968), The Act of the Heart (1970), The Pyx (1973) and The Courage of Kavik the Wolf Dog (1980), and composed a substantial amount of chamber music. He also composed music for six ballets, an opera, some incidental music for the theatre, and a few vocal art songs and choral works. He was awarded a Juno Award in 1996 for his symphonic work Touchings, which was recorded by the Esprit Orchestra on the Nexus label. He won the 1998 composition prize at the International Rostrum of Composers for Borealis, a symphonic work co-commissioned by the Toronto Symphony Orchestra, Soundstreams Canada, and CBC Radio. In 2002 the Canadian Music Centre released a commercial recording dedicated to his music, Canadian Composers Portraits: Harry Freedman.

Biography
At the age of three, Freedman immigrated with his family from Poland to Canada where the family settled in Medicine Hat, Alberta. His father worked in the fur trade. At the age of 9, Freedman and his family relocated to Winnipeg where he enrolled at the Winnipeg School of Art at the age of 13 to study the art of painting.

Freedman's musical training began relatively late. He was an admirer of big band music and began taking his first music lessons in the clarinet in 1940 at the age of 18. His teacher, Arthur Hart, would eventually become the principal clarinetist of the Winnipeg Symphony Orchestra and it is from him that Freedman got his first exposure to symphonic music. His musical training was interrupted for several years with the outbreak of World War II, and he spent 1941–1945 as a member of the Royal Canadian Air Force. In 1945 he entered The Royal Conservatory of Music, where he studied from 1945 to 1951. His most influential teachers at the school were his music composition professor, John Weinzweig, and his oboe instructor, Perry Bauman. He also studied in the summers at the Tanglewood Music Center where he was a pupil of Olivier Messiaen and Aaron Copland.

In 1946, Freedman became a member of the Toronto Symphony Orchestra as an english hornist, remaining with the orchestra through 1971. In 1951 he helped co-found the Canadian League of Composers, later serving as the organization president from 1975 to 1978. From 1972 to 1981, he taught at the Courtenay Youth Music Centre where he was also the composer-in-residence. Among his notable pupil there was Gilles Bellemare. In 1977 he was the subject of a radio documentary made by Norma Beecroft for the CBC. From 1979 to 1981, he was the president of the Guild of Canadian Film Composers and, from 1985 to 1990, he was music officer for the Toronto Arts Council. In 1980 the Canadian Music Council named him composer of the year, and he was made an Officer of the Order of Canada in 1984. From 1989 to 1991, he served on the music faculty of the University of Toronto, where he taught classes in music composition and orchestration.

See also 

 Music of Canada
 List of Canadian composers

References

External links
Harry Freedman Biography and Audio Samples (Canadian Music Center)
 Harry Freedman Biography (Encyclopedia of Music in Canada)
 

1922 births
2005 deaths
Canadian male composers
Deaths from cancer in Ontario
Cor anglais players
Officers of the Order of Canada
Musicians from Toronto
The Royal Conservatory of Music alumni
Academic staff of the University of Toronto
20th-century Canadian composers
20th-century Canadian male musicians
Polish emigrants to Canada